Vojšanci is a village in the municipality of Negotino, North Macedonia.

Demographics
According to the 2002 census, the village had a total of 432 inhabitants. Ethnic groups in the village include:

Macedonians 423
Serbs 9

References

Villages in Negotino Municipality